Manifest Decimation is the debut album by American thrash metal band Power Trip. It was released on June 11, 2013 through Southern Lord Recordings. The album is a precursor to Nightmare Logic, which launched them to stardom with their brand of old school thrash metal. The album was produced, engineered, mixed, and mastered by Arthur Rizk (additional tracking done in Argyle, Texas by Daniel Schmuck).

Background
Power Trip is an American thrash metal band that formed in 2008 in Dallas, Texas. Their sound has been described by critics as a cross between thrash metal and hardcore punk, as well as simply crossover thrash.

Reception
Pitchfork writer Brandon Stosuy praised the band's debut album in a positive review of 8.0. Shayne Mathis from Metal Injection also gave the album a positive review. AllMusic reviewer Thom Jurek gave the album 7/10 stars.

Track listing
All tracks written by Power Trip.

Personnel
 Riley Gale – vocals
 Blake Ibanez – lead guitar
 Nick Stewart – rhythm guitar
 Chris Whetzel – bass
 Chris Ulsh – drums

References

2013 debut albums
Power Trip (band) albums
Southern Lord Records albums